Julie Maurine Foudy (born January 23, 1971) is an American retired soccer midfielder, two-time FIFA Women's World Cup champion and two-time Olympic gold medalist. She played for the United States women's national soccer team from 1988 to 2004. Foudy finished her international career with 274 caps and served as the team's captain from 2000 to 2004 as well as the co-captain from 1991 to 2000. In 1997, she was the first American and first woman to receive the FIFA Fair Play Award.

From 2000 to 2002, Foudy served as president of the Women's Sports Foundation. In 2006, she co-founded the Julie Foudy Sports Leadership Academy, an organization focused on developing leadership skills in teenage girls. In 2007, she was inducted into the National Soccer Hall of Fame with her teammate, Mia Hamm. She is currently an analyst, reporter and the primary color commentator for women's soccer telecasts on ESPN.

Foudy is the author of Choose to Matter: Being Courageously and Fabulously YOU and appeared in the HBO documentary Dare to Dream: The Story of the U.S. Women's Soccer Team. She was the executive producer of the documentary short, An Equal Playing Field, starring Christen Press and producer of the ESPN Nine for IX episode entitled The 99ers, featuring some of her teammates from the 1999 FIFA Women's World Cup-winning U.S. national team.

Early life
Foudy was born on January 23, 1971, in San Diego, California but raised in Mission Viejo. She graduated from Mission Viejo High School in 1989, where she was a two-time First-Team All-American. Foudy was named the Los Angeles Times High School Player of the 1980s and the Player of the Year in southern California for three straight years (1987–1989).

Stanford Cardinal, 1989–1992
Foudy attended Stanford University, where she was honored as the Stanford Cardinal women's soccer Player of the Year for three straight years (1989–91). She was a four-time NSCAA All-American at Stanford and finished her collegiate career with 52 goals, 32 assists and 136 points in 78 appearances. She was named the 1991 Soccer America Player of the Year and the 1989 Soccer America Freshman of the Year and was a two-time finalist for the Hermann Trophy in 1991 and 1992. She helped lead the Cardinal to NCAA tournament playoff berths all four years. She was the recipient of the Stanford Outstanding Freshman, Sophomore and Junior Athlete Award and was named to Soccer America's College Team of the Decade for the 1990s.

Playing career

Club

Sacramento Storm 
Foudy played for the Sacramento Storm, which won the 1993, 1995 and 1997 California State Amateur championship.

Tyresö FF
In 1994, Foudy played for Tyresö FF in the Damallsvenskan in Sweden, joining her national team teammates Michelle Akers, Mary Harvey, and Kristine Lilly.

San Diego Spirit, 2001–2003
Foudy held the captain's position for her Women's United Soccer Association (WUSA) team, the San Diego Spirit. She made 59 regular season appearances, scoring eight goals and providing 13 assists. When the WUSA suspended operations in September 2003, Foudy was the official player's representative to the ongoing efforts to resurrect the league.

International
Foudy began traveling with the United States women's national soccer team as a 16-year-old. She attended the 1988 FIFA Women's Invitation Tournament as a non-playing substitute, then made her first appearance against France at the Mundialito on July 29, 1988.

Foudy played in four FIFA Women's World Cup tournaments, winning two FIFA Women's World Cups—in 1991 and 1999. She played in three Summer Olympic Games, winning an Olympic gold medal in 1996, Silver in 2000, and Gold again in 2004. Following the 2004 Olympic Games, Foudy joined fellow soccer icons Mia Hamm, Joy Fawcett and Brandi Chastain in a 10-game "farewell tour" that marked the end of what the media labeled the "golden era" of US women's soccer. The St. Petersburg Times said the team, "... changed the face of women's soccer".

International goals

Sports broadcasting career
Foudy has served as an in-studio analyst for ABC, ESPN and ESPN2's coverage of the 2006 FIFA World Cup and UEFA Euro 2008, and has provided on-air commentary and analysis during United States Women's National Team matches since then.  She has also coanchored ABC and ESPN telecasts of the 2007 FIFA Women's World Cup and the 2007 season of Major League Soccer, including the MLS Cup. She appeared as a pundit for the ESPN coverage of the UEFA Euro 2008 championship finals, together with Andy Gray and Tommy Smyth. For the 2010 FIFA World Cup, she served as a reporter and analyst, doing features, interviews and analysis in South Africa for ESPN. Foudy is also a reporter for ESPN's investigative program, Outside the Lines. She served as a sportsdesk reporter for NBC Sports coverage of the 2008 Summer Olympics. She also fills in for Dana Jacobson on ESPN First Take. Since late-2010, Foudy has been paired with Glenn Davis or Ian Darke on ESPN's primary broadcast team for women's soccer telecasts, as was the case for the 2011 FIFA Women's World Cup.

On August 20, 2013, ESPN Films teamed up with Foudy to premiere their new Nine for IX film on the 1999 Women's World Cup Team, The 99ers. The film, directed by Erin Leyden, and produced by Foudy, tells the incredible story of the 1999 United States women's national soccer team, using Foudy's personal behind the scenes footage. Reuniting key players from the 1999 squad and talking with current U.S. players as well, the film examines how women's soccer – and women's sports as a whole – has changed since that epic day at the Rose Bowl.

Foudy worked as ESPN's reporter from the 2018 Winter Olympics and the 2019 FIFA Women's World Cup.

Foudy is the host of the podcast Laughter Permitted, which interviews "trailblazers in sports about the joy/chaos of life and sports."

In 2023, Foudy joined WBD Sports to work as the lead match analyst for USWNT and USMNT matches. She continues to work for ESPN as well.

Julie Foudy Sports Leadership Academy 
The Julie Foudy Sports Leadership Academy (JFSLA) is an organization focused on sports and leadership for girls founded in 2006 by Foudy and her husband Ian Sawyers. The academy hosts one-week combined sports camp (soccer or lacrosse) and leadership academy for girls age 12–18. The staff includes Olympic gold medalists, World Cup champions and other leaders. The camps are focused on leadership building "on and off the field". According to Foudy, “...having a productive successful team is not about one person or about one part of that team. It’s a successful team which means everyone contributes. When I look back over my U.S. team career our most successful teams which won World Cups and Olympic medals had one common denominator, we all contributed to positive team chemistry.” While conducting a youth soccer clinic in Tampa in 2006, she said that the success of the U.S. women's soccer team in the FIFA World Cup tournaments and Summer Olympics had transformed the way soccer federations internationally think about women's soccer.

Connection to espnW 
EspnW's network appeals to young women of GenZ who were born between 1997 and 2012. EspnW was founded in July 2010. EspnW and JFSLA work together to create an inspiring environment to promote young female athletes. These two organizations uses multiple platforms including social media such as twitter, snapchat and Instagram to help promote women's sports.

Honors and awards
Foudy was selected for induction into the National Soccer Hall of Fame for the class of 2007 alongside former teammate Mia Hamm. Foudy and Hamm's induction was the first all-female class of the U.S. National Soccer Hall of Fame.

In 1997, she received the FIFA Fair Play Award for her work against child labor, the first American and first woman to win the award. For her accomplishments in soccer in the United States, Foudy was awarded the Golden Blazer in 2015 by Men in Blazers.

The American Library Association selected Foudy as Honorary Chair of National Library Week 2017.

Personal and political activism

Foudy has been active in a number of political causes relating to women's rights and workers' rights. In 1998, she received the FIFA Fair Play Award in recognition of her advocacy against child labor in sports equipment manufacturing. The year before she had made trip to Pakistan to inspect working conditions at a factory where soccer balls were manufactured for her then-sponsor, Reebok.

In 2002, Foudy, a former president of the Women's Sports Foundation, was named by United States Secretary of Education Rod Paige to the Commission on Opportunity in Athletics, a panel charged with reviewing the effects and implementation of the landmark 1972 Title IX legislation. Foudy and fellow commission member Donna de Varona refused to sign the report authored by the commission, saying that the report downplayed the persistence of gender-based discrimination in school athletics and that some of its recommendations would allow schools to get away with discrimination. They released a minority report recommending that current anti-discrimination policies remain in place. Paige ultimately decided to only pursue the recommendations that earned unanimous support from the commission.

Foudy and Ian Sawyers have been married since 1995. Foudy gave birth to their first child, a daughter named Isabel Ann, on January 1, 2007.  Their second child, a son named Declan, was born in December 2008.

In 2014, Brandi Chastain and Foudy worked together to host clinics for young women in Brazil to encourage young women to play soccer.

Foudy appeared in the HBO documentary Dare to Dream: The Story of the U.S. Women's Soccer Team. She also appears in the HBO Max documentary film LFG.

See also

 List of Olympic medalists in football
 List of 1996 Summer Olympics medal winners
 List of 2000 Summer Olympics medal winners
 List of 2004 Summer Olympics medal winners
 List of footballers with 100 or more caps
 List of MLS Cup broadcasters
 List of ESPN Major League Soccer personalities
 List of people from San Diego
 List of Stanford University people

References

Further reading
 Grainey, Timothy (2012), Beyond Bend It Like Beckham: The Global Phenomenon of Women's Soccer, University of Nebraska Press, 
 Kassouf, Jeff (2011), Girls Play to Win Soccer, Norwood House Press, 
 Lisi, Clemente A. (2010), The U.S. Women's Soccer Team: An American Success Story, Scarecrow Press, 
 Longman, Jere (2009), The Girls of Summer: The U.S. Women's Soccer Team and How it Changed the World, HarperCollins, 
 Savage, Jeff (1999), Julie Foudy: Soccer Superstar, Lerner Publishing Group,

External links
 
 Julie Foudy Soccer Camps Official site
  Julie Foudy Sports Leadership Academy Official site
 U.S. Olympic Team bio
 San Diego Spirit player profile
 Text of Julie Foudy's letter to Title IX Commission
 ESPN Bio
 

1971 births
Living people
American women's soccer players
United States women's international soccer players
Women's association football midfielders
Footballers at the 1996 Summer Olympics
Footballers at the 2000 Summer Olympics
Footballers at the 2004 Summer Olympics
Olympic gold medalists for the United States in soccer
Olympic silver medalists for the United States in soccer
American Youth Soccer Organization players
Soccer players from San Diego
Stanford Cardinal women's soccer players
Women's United Soccer Association players
San Diego Spirit players
Washington Freedom players
Association football commentators
American television sports announcers
FIFA Century Club
1991 FIFA Women's World Cup players
1995 FIFA Women's World Cup players
1999 FIFA Women's World Cup players
2003 FIFA Women's World Cup players
Sportspeople from Mission Viejo, California
Tyresö FF players
FIFA Women's World Cup-winning players
Major League Soccer broadcasters
Medalists at the 2004 Summer Olympics
Medalists at the 2000 Summer Olympics
Medalists at the 1996 Summer Olympics
American expatriate women's soccer players
Expatriate women's footballers in Sweden
American expatriate sportspeople in Sweden
Damallsvenskan players
Women's Sports Foundation executives
Women association football commentators
Women sports announcers
Women sports journalists
National Soccer Hall of Fame members
California Storm players
National Women's Soccer League commentators
American soccer commentators
Mission Viejo High School alumni